The Chinese Ambassador to Thailand is the official representative of the People's Republic of China to the Kingdom of Thailand.

List of representatives

See also
China–Thailand relations

References 

 
Thailand
China